Balsys is the masculine form of a Lithuanian surname. Its feminine forms  are: Balsienė (married woman or widow) and Balsytė (unmarried woman). Notable people with the surname include:

, Lithuanian composer
Linas Balsys (born 1976), Lithuanian Paralympics athlete 

Lithuanian-language surnames